Jenny Wood (born 24 June 1948) is a Rhodesian former swimmer. She competed in the women's 100 metre butterfly at the 1964 Summer Olympics, where she was eliminated in the heats.

References

1948 births
Living people
Rhodesian female swimmers
Olympic swimmers of Rhodesia
Swimmers at the 1964 Summer Olympics
Commonwealth Games competitors for Rhodesia and Nyasaland
Swimmers at the 1962 British Empire and Commonwealth Games
White Rhodesian people
Place of birth missing (living people)